Onoba is a genus of minute sea snails, marine gastropod mollusks or micromollusks in the family Rissoidae.

Species
Species within the genus Onoba include:

Onoba aculeus (Gould, 1841)
Onoba aedonis (Watson, 1886)
Onoba alaskana (Dall, 1886)
Onoba algida Ponder & Worsfold, 1994
Onoba amissa Ponder & Worsfold, 1994
Onoba analoga (Powell, 1937)
Onoba anderssoni (Strebel, 1908)
Onoba aurivillii (Dall, 1887)
Onoba bakeri (Bartsch, 1910)
Onoba biangulata (Laws, 1936) †
Onoba brachia (Watson, 1886)
Onoba breogani Rolán, 2008
Onoba brunnea Golikov & Kussakin, 1978
Onoba carpenteri (Weinkauff, 1885)
Onoba castanella (Dall, 1886)
Onoba cerinella Dall, 1887
Onoba cingulata (Middendorff, 1849)
Onoba compsa Bartsch in Golikov, Gulbin & Sirenko, 1987
Onoba crassicordata Worsfold, Avern & Ponder, 1993
Onoba cryptolira (Laws, 1950) †
Onoba dalli (Bartsch, 1927)
Onoba delecta Ponder, 1983
Onoba delli (Ponder, 1968)
Onoba dimassai Amati & Nofroni, 1991
Onoba duplicata (Powell, 1937)
Onoba egorovae Numanami, 1996
Onoba elegans (Ponder, 1965)
Onoba emiliorolani Engl, 2011
Onoba erugata Ponder & Worsfold, 1994
Onoba exarata (Stimpson, 1851)
Onoba exuta (Powell, 1937)
Onoba filostria (Melvill & Standen, 1912)
Onoba forresterensis (Willett, 1934)
Onoba fortis Pilsbry & Olsson, 1941
Onoba fuegoensis (Strebel, 1908)
Onoba fusiformis (Carpenter, 1847)
Onoba galaica Rolán, 2008
Onoba georgiana (Pfeffer, 1886)
Onoba gianninii (Nordsieck, 1974)
Onoba gibbera (Laws, 1950) †
Onoba gigas Bozzetti, 2008
Onoba glaphyra (Watson, 1886)
Onoba grisea (Martens, 1885)
Onoba guzmani Hoenselaar & Moolenbeek, 1987
Onoba improcera (Warén, 1996)
Onoba inflatella (Thiele, 1912)
Onoba islandica (Friele, 1876)
Onoba josae Moolenbeek & Hoenselaar, 1987
Onoba kergueleni (Smith, 1875)
Onoba klausgrohi Engl, 2011
Onoba kurilensis Golikov & Kussakin, 1974
Onoba kyskensis (Bartsch, 1911)
Onoba lactea (Finlay, 1926) †
Onoba lacuniformis Ponder & Worsfold, 1994
Onoba lantzi (Vélain, 1877)
Onoba laticingulata Golikov & Kussakin, 1978
Onoba leptalea (Verrill, 1884)
Onoba lincta (Watson, 1873)
Onoba lubrica (Suter, 1908)
Onoba melvilli (Hedley, 1916)
Onoba merelinoides Worsfold, Avern & Ponder, 1993
Onoba mighelsii (Stimpson, 1851)
Onoba moreleti Dautzenberg, 1889
Onoba multilirata (May, 1915)
Onoba muriei (Bartsch & Rehder, 1939)
Onoba nunezi Rolán & Hernández, 2004
Onoba obliqua (Warén, 1974)
Onoba oliverioi Smriglio & Mariottini, 2000
Onoba palmeri (Dall, 1919)
Onoba paucicarinata Ponder, 1983
Onoba paucilirata (Melvill & Standen, 1916)
Onoba paupereques (Finlay, 1926)
Onoba perplexa (Finlay, 1924) †
Onoba protofimbriata Ponder & Worsfold, 1994
Onoba protopustulata Ponder & Worsfold, 1994
Onoba rubicunda (Tate & May, 1900)
Onoba russica Golikov, 1986
Onoba schraderi (Strebel, 1908)
Onoba scythei (Philippi, 1868)
Onoba semicostata (Montagu, 1803)
Onoba simplex (Powell, 1927)
Onoba stampinensis Lozouet & Maestrati, 1982
Onoba steineni (Strebel, 1908)
Onoba striola Ponder & Worsfold, 1994
Onoba suavis (Thiele, 1925)
Onoba subaedonis Ponder & Worsfold, 1994
Onoba subantarctica (Hedley, 1916)
Onoba subincisa Ponder & Worsfold, 1994
Onoba sulcula Ponder & Worsfold, 1994
Onoba tarifensis Hoenselaar & Moolenbeek, 1987
Onoba tenuistriata Golikov, Gulbin & Sirenko, 1987
Onoba torelli (Warén, 1996)
Onoba transenna (Watson, 1886)
Onoba tristanensis Worsfold, Avern & Ponder, 1993
Onoba zebina (Finlay, 1930) †

Species brought into synonymy
 Onoba aculea (Gould, 1841): synonym of Onoba aculeus (Gould, 1841)
 Onoba bassiana Hedley, 1911: synonym of Botelloides bassianus (Hedley, 1911)
 Onoba bickertoni (Hedley, 1916): synonym of Subonoba turqueti (Lamy, 1905)
 Onoba candida (Brown, 1844): synonym of Onoba semicostata (Montagu, 1803)
 Onoba castanea (Møller, 1842): synonym of Boreocingula castanea (Møller, 1842)
 Onoba cristallinula (Manzoni, 1868): synonym of Crisilla cristallinula (Manzoni, 1868)
 Onoba cruzi (Castellanos & Fernández, 1974): synonym of Alvania cruzi (Castellanos & Fernández, 1974)
 Onoba cymatodes Melvill & Standen, 1916: synonym of Fictonoba cymatodes (Melvill & Standen, 1916)
 Onoba delicata Philippi, 1849: synonym of Iravadia delicata (Philippi, 1849)
 Onoba elongata Hornung & Mermod, 1928: synonym of Iravadia elongata (Hornung & Mermod, 1928)
 Onoba ferruginea A. Adams, 1861: synonym of Alvania ferruginea A. Adams, 1861
 Onoba gelida (Smith, 1907): synonym of Subonoba gelida (Smith, 1907)
 Onoba jeffreysi (Waller, 1864): synonym of Alvania jeffreysi (Waller, 1864)
 Onoba karica Golikov, 1986: synonym of Onoba aculeus (Gould, 1841)
 Onoba manzoniana Rolán, 1987: synonym of Manzonia manzoniana (Rolán, 1987)
 Onoba moerchi Collin, 1886: synonym of Alvania moerchi (Collin, 1886)
 Onoba ovata (Thiele, 1912): synonym of Subonoba ovata (Thiele, 1912)
 Onoba pelagica (Stimpson, 1851): synonym of Frigidoalvania pelagica (Stimpson, 1851)
 Onoba philippinica O. Boettger, 1893: synonym of Iravadia delicata (Philippi, 1849)
 Onoba quadrasi O. Boettger, 1893: synonym of Pellamora densilabrum (Melvill, 1912)
 Onoba scotiana (Melvill & Standen, 1907): synonym of Onoba semicostata (Montagu, 1803)
 Onoba striata (J. Adams, 1797): synonym of Onoba semicostata (Montagu, 1803)
 Onoba sulcata (Strebel, 1908): synonym of Onoba grisea (Martens, 1885)
 Onoba tenuilirata Boettger, 1893: synonym of Iravadia tenuilirata (Boettger, 1893)
 Onoba turqueti (Lamy, 1905): synonym of Subonoba turqueti (Lamy, 1905)
 Onoba verrilli: synonym of Alvania verrilli (Friele, 1886)
 Onoba vigoensis Rolán, 1983: synonym of Manzonia vigoensis (Rolán, 1983)
 Onoba vitrea (Montagu): synonym of Hyala vitrea (Montagu, 1803)
 Onoba wareni Templado & Rolán, 1986: synonym of Alvania wareni (Templado & Rolán, 1986)

References

 Gofas, S.; Le Renard, J.; Bouchet, P. (2001). Mollusca, in: Costello, M.J. et al. (Ed.) (2001). European register of marine species: a check-list of the marine species in Europe and a bibliography of guides to their identification. Collection Patrimoines Naturels, 50: pp. 180–213
 Ponder W. F. (1985). A review of the Genera of the Rissoidae (Mollusca: Mesogastropoda: Rissoacea). Records of the Australian Museum supplement 4: 1-221 page(s): 54-61
 Spencer, H.; Marshall. B. (2009). All Mollusca except Opisthobranchia. In: Gordon, D. (Ed.) (2009). New Zealand Inventory of Biodiversity. Volume One: Kingdom Animalia. 584 pp

External links

Rissoidae
Gastropod genera